Nioro du Rip Department is one of the 45 departments of Senegal, located in the region of Kaolack.

The principal settlement is the commune of Nioro du Rip. Rural districts (Communautés rurales) comprise:
Médina Sabakh Arrondissement
Kayemor
Médina Sabakh
Ngayène
Paoskoto Arrondissement
Gainthe Kaye
Paos Koto
Porokhane
Taïba Niassène
Dabaly
Darou Salam
Wack Ngouna Arrondissement
Keur Maba Diakhou
Keur Madongo
Ndramé Escale
Wack Ngouna

The total population in 2005 was estimated at 282,175.

Historic sites in Nioro du Rip department

 Fortification of Maba Diakhou Bâ at Nioro du Rip
 Mausoleum of Mame Diarra Bousso at Porokhane
 Wells of Mame Diarra Bousso
 Tomb of Matar Kalla Dramé at Ndimb Dramé
 Megalithic site at Sine Ngayène
 Megalithic site of Mbolop Tobé in the village of Konomba
 Megalithic site of Sine Wanar
 Mosque of Kabakoto

References

Departments of Senegal
Kaolack Region